The International Young Design Entrepreneur of the Year (IYDEY) is a British Council award that is part of the International Young Creative Entrepreneur (IYCE) programme, which has been developed with 100% Design, a commercial interior design fair.  It was established in 2005. It is targeted at designers aged 25 to 35.  National winners are selected from countries, and brought to the United Kingdom for a tour of UK design industry, and to attend the 100% Design show.

IYDEY 2005
National winners include:
 Argentina: Hernán Braberman
 India: Neil Foley
 Lebanon: Raëd Abillama
 Lithuania: Beatrice Vanagaite
 Nigeria: Lanre Lawal
 Philippines: Jonathan Jay Aldeguer 
 Poland: Ela Skrzypek
 Romania: Carla Szabo 
 Slovenia: Nika Zupanc
 Thailand: Peerachat Prajeeyachat

The winner of the 2005 award is Lanre Lawal, a graphic designer and filmmaker from Nigeria.

IYDEY 2006
National winners include:
 Brazil: Paula Dib
 India: Ramesh Manickam
 Indonesia: M. Ridwan Kamil
 Lebanon: Maya Karanouh
 Slovenia: Gorazd Malačič
 South Africa: Heath Nash
 Thailand: Makorn Chaovanich  
Lithuania: Darius Cekanauskas

The winner of the 2006 award is Paula Dib, a Brazilian designer.

IYDEY 2007
National winners include:
 Argentina: Manu Rapoport
 China: Xu Ming 
 Estonia: Markko Karu
 India: Gunjan Gupta
 Indonesia: Gustaff Harriman Iskandar
 Nigeria:Oluseyi Olubunmi Taylor
 Poland: Tomek Rygalik
 Slovenia: Martin Bricelj
 Thailand: Ruttikorn Vuttikorn
 Venezuela: Sigal Cohen

The winner of the 2007 award is Sigal Cohen from Venezuela.

IYDEY 2008
Finalists include:
 Egypt: Mohamed Fares Aly
 India: Siddhartha Das
 Lebanon: Nathalie Fallaha
 Malaysia:  Ng Si Juan.
 Poland: Michał Kowalski
 South Africa: Jang Tsai
 Slovenia: Luka Stepan
 Taiwan: Nancy Chen
 Turkey: Osman Can Özcanlï

The winner of the 2008 award is Siddhartha Das.

IYDEY 2009
Finalists include:
 Indonesia: Johansen Samsoedin
 Slovenia: Anja Zorko
 South Africa: Given Nkuna
 Taiwan: I-Ming Shih
 Turkey: Pınar Yar Gövsa

The winner of the 2009 award is Rami Farook, from United Arab Emirates.

See also
 International Young Publisher of the Year
 International Young Music Entrepreneur of the Year

References

External links
 https://web.archive.org/web/20130614064613/http://ec.europa.eu/culture/documents/case25youngcreativeentrepreneurawards.pdf

Early career awards
British Council
Awards established in 2005